The 2018 Barcelona FIA Formula 2 round was a pair of motor races for Formula 2 cars that took place on 12 and 13 May 2018 at the Circuit de Barcelona-Catalunya in Catalonia, Spain as part of the FIA Formula 2 Championship. It was the third round of the 2018 FIA Formula 2 Championship and ran in support of the 2018 Spanish Grand Prix.

The race weekend also saw history making from ART Grand Prix, as the French outfit managed to secure race victories in both races of the weekend to become the first team in modern Formula 2 to do so; with George Russell winning the Feature Race and Jack Aitken winning the Sprint Race respectively.

Classification

Qualifying

Feature race

Notes
  – Nicholas Latifi set the fastest lap in the race but because he finished outside the top 10, the two bonus points for fastest lap went to Artem Markelov as he set the fastest lap inside the top 10 finishers.

Sprint race

Championship standings after the round

Drivers' Championship standings

Teams' Championship standings

References

External links 
 

Barcelona
Formula 2
Auto races in Spain
May 2018 sports events in Spain